Public Schools Branch (PSB), formerly the English Language School Board or ELSB, is a Canadian school district in Prince Edward Island.

The Public Schools Branch is an Anglophone district operating 56 public schools (gr. K–12) in Prince County, Queens County and Kings County. It maintains offices in Stratford and Summerside with the current enrollment at approximately 20,000 students and 3500 employees.

History
The English Language School Board was created in 2012 when Eastern School District and Western School Board were merged. The Board took office on January 1, 2013.

On November 5, 2015, the PEI Government announced that it would be dissolving the English Language School Board, replacing it with the Public Schools Branch.

Family of Schools

Bluefield Family of Schools
Bluefield Senior High School
East Wiltshire Intermediate School
Central Queens Elementary School
Eliot River Elementary School
Englewood School
Gulf Shore Consolidated School
Westwood Primary School

Charlottetown Rural Family of Schools
Charlottetown Rural Senior High School
Stonepark Intermediate School - In fall 2016 it had 908 students, with an increase by 70 from the previous academic year, making it the public K-12 school in PEI with the largest student enrollment. The enrollment was 12% over the building's official capacity.
L. M. Montgomery Elementary School
Stratford Elementary School
Glen Stewart Primary School
Donagh Regional School
Sherwood Elementary School

Colonel Gray Family of Schools
Colonel Gray Senior High School
Birchwood Intermediate School
Parkdale Elementary School
Prince Street Elementary School
Queen Charlotte Intermediate School
Spring Park Elementary School
St. Jean Elementary School
West Kent Elementary School
West Royalty Elementary School

Kensington Family of Schools
Kensington Intermediate Senior High School
Queen Elizabeth Elementary School

Kinkora Family of Schools
Kinkora Regional High School
Amherst Cove Consolidated School
Somerset Elementary School

Montague Family of Schools
Montague Regional High School
Belfast Consolidated School
Cardigan Consolidated School
Georgetown Elementary School
Montague Consolidated School
Montague Intermediate School
Southern Kings Consolidated School
Vernon River Consolidated School

Morell Family of Schools
Morell Regional High School
Morell Consolidated School
Mt. Stewart Consolidated School

Souris Family of Schools
Souris Regional School

Three Oaks Family of Schools
Three Oaks Senior High School
Athena Consolidated School
Miscouche Consolidated School
Summerside Intermediate School
Elm Street Elementary School
Greenfield Elementary School
Parkside Elementary School

Westisle Family of Schools
Westisle Composite High School
Hernewood Intermediate School
Bloomfield Elementary School
Ellerslie Elementary School
O’Leary Elementary School
M. E. Callaghan Intermediate School
Alberton Elementary School
St. Louis Elementary School
Tignish Elementary School

See also
List of schools in Prince Edward Island
List of school districts in Prince Edward Island
Higher education in Prince Edward Island

References

External links
 
 
 
 

School districts in Prince Edward Island
Summerside, Prince Edward Island
Education in Prince County, Prince Edward Island
Education in Queens County, Prince Edward Island
Education in Kings County, Prince Edward Island